Rádio Comercial is a commercial radio station in Portugal aimed at young people and adults. It has a broad format including contemporary, pop and rock music. It is among the most listened to radio stations in the country.

History
Rádio Comercial was born on March 12, 1979, as a subsidiary of Rádiodifusão Portuguesa. The name was chosen because it was the only RDP station to allow adverts at the time. However, the station can trace its roots to Rádio Clube Português (RCP), a very important and influential station founded in 1930. RCP existed until 1975, when it was nationalized as part of the Carnation revolution. Then, the channel was swallowed into RDP, and was later privatized on March 31, 1993, to the Correio da Manhã newspaper, and later sold to Media Capital and PRISA, in 1997. From that time until 2003, the station focused on rock music. In 2022, the Media Capital Rádio group, which includes Rádio Comercial, was sold to Bauer Media Group.

So Get Up and Rádio Comercial
During a one-year period from late 1992 to late 1993, the Greek-Californian artist Ithaka Darin Pappas, who lived in Lisbon for a six-year duration, hosted a small English-language segment on Rádio Comercial called Lounge Lizard Larry within the daily afternoon show, Quarto Bairro.

Quarto Bairro was produced by Eduardo Guerra and recorded by Pedro Costa (currently a DJ at Antena 3 (Portugal)), with news by Sílvia Souto Cunha (present day editor of Visão Magazine). For the Lounge Lizard Larry sequences Ithaka would, for the most part, read his own poems, written specifically for the show, on top on B-side instrumental hip-hop tracks.

On one day in late 1992 at a café outside of the Rádio Comercial studios in the neighborhood called Amoreiras, Ithaka wrote a poem called, The End Of The Earth Is Upon Us and some minutes after completion read it live on top of a Naughty By Nature instrumental. A couple of months later, he recorded a demo of the song in Manchester, England with original music. And about eight months after that, the electronic music group Underground Sound of Lisbon, who had been hearing him read his writings on-air, invited him to rerecord The End Of The Earth Is Upon Us with their music for the B-side of a 12" vinyl single they were recording. Thru the decades the song, retitled So Get Up, has achieved a wide range of releases and remixes by international artists, but the original recording of the vocal-poem took place at Rádio Comercial in Amoreiras.

Team
Presenters

Pedro Ribeiro
Vera Fernandes
Vasco Palmeirim
Nuno Markl
Diogo Beja
Joana Azevedo
Rita Rugeroni
Ana Isabel Arroja
Wilson Honrado
João Paulo Sousa
Ana do Carmo
Ana Delgado Martins
Mafalda Castro

Staff

João Pedro Sousa
Nuno Luz
Mário Rui
Nuno Gonçalo
Ana Margarida
Ana Martins
Margarida Moura
Patrícia Pereira
António Dias
Cláudia Macedo
Paulo Miranda
Margarida Gonçalves

Current presenters and shows
From Monday until Friday

Saturday

Sunday

Frequency (Rede Nacional de Emissores)
Alcácer do Sal: 97.4 FM / 96.8 FM
Aveiro: 90.8 FM
Braga: 99.2 FM
Bragança: 93.9 FM / 91.9 FM
Beja: 92.0 FM / 88.1 FM
Castelo Branco: 98.2 FM
Coimbra: 90.8 FM
Évora: 92.0 FM
Faro: 96.1 FM / 88.1 FM
Guarda: 96.1 FM
Guimarães: 99.2 FM
Leiria: 89.0 FM / 90.8 FM / 99.8 FM
Lisboa: 97.4 FM
Portalegre: 98.9 FM
Porto: 97.7 FM
Santarém: 99.8 FM / 97.4 FM
Setúbal: 97.4 FM /96.8 FM
Valença do Minho: 99.0 FM
Vila Real: 88.9 FM
Viseu: 88.7 FM / 90.8 FM

See also
Cidade
M80 Radio

References

External links
Official site

Radio stations in Portugal
Mass media in Portugal
Radio stations established in 1979
1979 establishments in Portugal